The 1979–80 Utah Utes men's basketball team represented University of Utah in the 1979–80 college basketball season.

Roster

Schedule

References 

Utah Utes men's basketball seasons
1979 in sports in Utah
1980 in sports in Utah